The Black Country dialect is spoken by many people in the Black Country, a region covering most of the four Metropolitan Boroughs of Dudley, Sandwell, Walsall and Wolverhampton. It also influences the accents of towns and villages in the rural counties to the north, south and west of the region. It is distinct from the Brummie dialect, which originates from the neighbouring city of Birmingham.

Description
In general, the Black Country dialect has resisted many of the changes from Middle English that are seen in other dialects of British English, resembling particularly Northern English and West Country English. 
 There is no trap-bath split, so there is no /ɑː/ in words like bath, grass, etc., so to rhyme with math(s), gas, etc.
Like most British accents (except Queen's English), there are glottal stops.
 /æ/ is uniformly pronounced as [a].
 There is no foot-strut split, so that cut rhymes with put, and both use /ʊ/.
 There is no NG-coalescence, so singer rhymes with finger, with both commonly pronounced with [ŋg~ŋk]. Indeed, the accent can be analysed as lacking the phoneme /ŋ/ with that sound instead being regarded as an allophone of /n/.
 The Black Country accent is non-rhotic, and draw and drawer are nearly homophones.
 Final unstressed vowels are further reduced, such as /wɪndə/ for window and /fə/ for far.
 Final fricative consonants can be voiced and so /s/ is pronounced as [z] and /f/ as [v], for example, bus is pronounced buzz.

The traditional Black Country dialect preserves many archaic traits of Early Modern English and even Middle English and can be very confusing for outsiders. Thee, thy and thou are still in use, as is the case in parts of Derbyshire, Yorkshire and Lancashire. "'Ow B'ist," meaning "How are you?" is a greeting contracted from "How be-est thou?" with the typical answer being "'Bay too bah," ("I be not too bad"), meaning "I am not too bad." "I haven't seen her" becomes "I ay sid 'er." Black Country dialect often uses "ar" where other parts of England use "yes" (this is common as far away as Yorkshire). Similarly, the local version of "you" is pronounced , rhyming with "so."  Among older speakers ye is used for you, as it is in most northern parts of England and Scotland. It is also common for older speakers to say "Her" instead of "She" ("'Er day did 'ah?", meaning "She didn't did she?"). The local pronunciation "goo" (elsewhere "go") or "gewin'" is similar to that elsewhere in the Midlands. It is quite common for broad Black Country speakers to say "agooin'" where others say "going". This is found in the greeting "Ow b'ist gooin?" (“How are you, How’s it going?”), to which a typical response would be "Bostin ah kid" ("Very well our kid"). Although the term yam yam may come from ya'm (you am), ya/ye is an archaic form of you and in many areas ye (pronounced like yea or ya) is used: "Owamya aer kid? — Ar ah'm owkay ta." It is possible that Black Country simply retains more country speech, unlike Birmingham, which has been settled for a much longer period of time and has developed a town speech and therefore been influenced more by standard English much longer.

A road sign containing local dialect was placed at the A461/A459/A4037 junction in 1997 before the construction of a traffic island on the site. The sign read, "If yowm saft enuff ter cum dahn 'ere agooin wum, yowr tay ull be spile't!!", which means, "If you're saft  (stupid) enough to come down here on your way home, your tea will be spoilt".

The dialect's perception was boosted in 2008 when an internet video, The Black Country Alphabet, described the whole alphabet in Black Country speak.

Common words 

 "Orroight" = "Alright"
 Used as a questioning greeting, short for "Am yow orroight?" 
 "Yow" = "You"
 "Yam" = "You are"
 From "Yow am" or "Yowm".
 This is the origin of "Yam Yams", a term designated by "Brummies" for the people from Wolverhampton who use this expression.
 "Am" = "Are"
 "Ar" = "Yes"
 "Arm" = "I'm"
 "Bin" = "Been", "Are" or "Am"
 "Bay" = "Not"
 "Dow" = "Doesn't"
 "Day" = "Didn't"
 "Her/'Er" = "She"
 "Cowin" = "Extremely"
 "Gewin/Gooin" = "Going"
 "Thay" = "They"
 "Oss" = "Horse"
 "Tekkin" = "Taking"
 "Cut" = "Canal"
 "Ay/Ayn" = "Ain't"
 "Ova" = "Over"
 "Cud" = "Could"
 "Cor/Car" = "Cannot"
 "Wammal" or "Scrammel" = "Dog"
 "Warra" = "What a"
 "Worrow" = Hello"
 "Wossant" or "War/Wor" = "Wasn't"
 E.g. "It wor me"
 "Blartin" = "Crying"
 "Babbie/Babby" = "Baby"
 "Me/Mar" = "My"
 "Kaylied" = "Drunk"
 "Arl" = "I'll"
 "Doe" = "Don't"
 "Tat" = "Junk" 
 "Tattin" = "Collecting scrap metal"
 "Tatter" = "Scrap collector"
 "Werk" = "Work"
 "Loff/Laff" = "Laugh"
 "Yed" = "Head"
 "Jed" = "Dead"
 "Tar" = "Thanks
 "Ah'm" = "I'm"
 "Aer Kid" or "Kidda" = A young relative, sibling, or friend
 "Arr" = "Yes"
 "Nah" = "No"
 "Saft" = "Stupid"
 "Summat" = "Something"
 "Mekkin" = "Making"
 "Med" = "Made"
 "Sayin" = "Saying"
 "Wench" = "Girlfriend" or "Girl"
 "Missis" = "Wife"

The neighbouring city of Birmingham may be called "Brum-a-jum" (Birmingham's colloquial name is Brummagem, a corruption of its older name of Bromwicham and hence West Bromwich) or Birminam (missing the "g" and "h" out and saying it the way it is spelt). Natives of Birmingham (Brummies) meanwhile often refer to their Black Country neighbours as "Yam Yams", a reference to the use of "yow am" instead of "you are". However its unlikely yam yam comes from yow'm, as the sound is totally different; it's more likely from ye (archaic form of you), as in yer'm, which when said quickly sounds like yam, as in "yam gooin daft" "you're going silly", or "don't be so stupid" in translation. How many still say this ye'm form is unknown. "Ye" for you sounds different from "ya" (which is spoken with a schwa vowel), which also means you. "Yo" can also be used in the same sentence as "ye/ya" e.g. "Yo ay gooin agen am ya?" Some areas also use "yo'me" and "yow'm", depending on location and local dialect, and phrases as with Birmingham can differ from area to area, so there is dialect variation across the Black Country without differing in the basic Black Country words. Quick speech and blended words as in "shutyarow up" (shut your row up, meaning be quiet) can seem hard to understand and can even sound like "shutchowrow up". The blendings are to be thought of as products of Black Country pronunciation, not separate dialectal words.

The general intonation can sound even more similar to that of the West Country dialects, which also has an up and down sound, but different from Brummie which tends to be one tone and going down at the end.

Authentic recordings 
The Survey of English Dialects recorded several traditional dialects from in and around the Black Country, which can be heard on the British Library Sound Archive website.

 G. Brooke (b.1888), market gardener from Himley, Staffordshire in the Black Country.
 Snead, Ted (b.1881), retired farm labourer from Hilton, Shropshire, a few miles west of the Black Country.
 William Wagstaffe (b.1876), retired labourer and smallholder from Romsley, Worcestershire, a few miles south of the Black Country.

Notes

 Black Country Slang A collection of Black Country dialect and slang words

References
 

Black Country
English language in England